Marina O'Loughlin is a British journalist, writer and restaurant critic.

She was the regular weekly restaurant reviewer in the London Metro from 2006 to 2012, before moving to The Guardian, where she took over from John Lanchester. In 2017, O'Loughlin succeeded the late A. A. Gill as restaurant critic for The Sunday Times, remaining until the end of October 2022.

She had a monthly travel column in the BBC Olive magazine detailing her food trips to locations including Macau and Glasgow, before moving on to BBC Good Food.

O'Loughlin has also worked on a freelance basis for The Independent and London Evening Standard  newspapers and Noble Rot magazine.

She is one of the most decorated restaurant critics working today, having been awarded the Guild of Food Writers' Restaurant Reviewer of the Year twice; once in 2011 and again in 2015  as well as Fortnum and Mason awards for Restaurant Writing in 2014  and 2015 and the prestigious 2015 Press Award for Criticism.
 
O'Loughlin is thought to be Glaswegian by birth, but now lives with her husband and two children between London and the Isle of Thanet on the Kent Coast.

She was said to be one of the most influential Londoners in the annual Evening Standard "1,000 Most Influential People in London" supplement in 2008, and again in 2010  and 2012. O'Loughlin has also made The Sunday Times' "Britain's 500 Most Influential" list three years running, from 2014 to 2016.

References

External links 

Guardian interview with O'Loughlin
Metro review of Shaka Zulu restaurant
Defence of 'Come Dine With Me' on Observer 'Word of Mouth' blog

British journalists
Living people
Year of birth missing (living people)
Alumni of the University of Edinburgh
British restaurant critics